St Patrick's High School is a Catholic primary and secondary school located in Saddar Town, Sindh, Karachi, Pakistan. Founded by the Jesuits in 1861, the school is the second-oldest school in Karachi. Since 1950, it has been run by the diocesan clergy of the Archdiocese of Karachi.

For the last 150 years, the school has produced well-known leaders and public figures, including two Presidents and two Prime Ministers of Pakistan, two Chief Ministers of Sindh, one deputy prime minister (of India) two Cardinals of the Catholic Church, and several Mayors of Karachi.

The school is owned by the Roman Catholic Church and managed by the Catholic Board of Education in Pakistan.

History 
The school was established on 6 May 1861, began with just three students, and officially registered as a high school in 1867. Its founder was Reverend Joseph A. Willy of the Society of Jesus (the "Jesuits"), who controlled the school until June 1935. It was then taken over by the Franciscan order until 6 October 1950. Since 1950, it has had Pakistani principals belonging to the Roman Catholic Archdiocese of Karachi.

Fr Stephen Raymond, a diocesan priest, became the first Pakistani principal of his alma mater in 1950. The era of Fr Raymond as principal from 1950 to 1974 is referred by many old students as the "golden era" of St Patrick's. Fr Raymond is credited with constructing the Cambridge Building (1950), St Patrick's College (1952), the Teachers' Training College (1959), the first School Auditorium (1972). The school celebrated its centenary in 1962 with the President of Pakistan, Field Marshal Mohammad Ayub Khan as the Chief Guest.

St Patrick's High School was one of the few private educational institutes that escaped nationalization in 1972.

On 6 May 2011, the former students of the school instituted the Father Stephen Raymond Gold Medal to be awarded to the top student from the Commerce Section, as part of the 150th anniversary of the school.

Former principals 

 Fr. Joseph Willy SJ 1861-65
 Fr. Basilius Haefly SJ 1865-1867
 Fr. Anselm Leiter SJ 1867-68
 Fr. Nicolas Pagani SJ 1868-72
 Fr. George Bridges SJ 1872-74
 Fr. Joseph Nueckel SJ 1874-76
 Fr. Francis Belz SJ 1876-87
 Fr. A. Bruder SJ 1887-94
 Fr. H. Jurgens SJ 1894-97
 Fr. A. Martins SJ 1897-1901
 Fr. C. Flick SJ 1901-04
 Fr. J. Meyer SJ 1904-09
 Fr. S. Boswin SJ 1909-21
 Fr. Hoogewerf SJ 1921-26
 Fr. Vincent Gimenez SJ 1926-35
 Fr. Achilles Meersman OFM 1935–38
 Fr. Hermes Kersten OFM 1938-1939
 Fr. Modestine Pöttgens OFM 1939-1948
 Fr. Achilles Meersman OFM 1948-50
 Stephen Raymond -1950-1975
 Anthony Theodore Lobo – principal 1975–1993
 Oswin Mascarenhas - 1993 to 2000
 Joseph Paul – principal 2000–2009
 Lawerence Manuel FSC 2016-17
 Sister Margaret Madden 2017-2020

Commermorative stamp 

To commemorate the 150 years of the school, Pakistan Post office issued a special postage stamp in the year 2011.

Notable teachers 

 Patrick Mendes – Olympic hockey player; teacher for over 50 years
 Jacob Harris
 O. B. Nazareth
 Liberius Pieterse – translator of the Bible into Urdu
 Joseph Cordeiro – first Cardinal of Pakistan
 Katie Gomes, awarded Pro Ecclesia et Pontifice Medal for 50 Years of Service in Catholic Education. 
 Fr J B Todd
 Norma Fernandes – recipient, Tamgha-i-Imtiaz for 50 years of service to education
 James deSouza – priest for over 50 years
 Anthony Theodore Lobo – former Bishop of Islamabad-Rawalpindi
 Joseph Paul – principal
 Yolande Henderson – former headmistress of the O' Levels
 Hilda Pereira, teacher for nearly 50 years

Notable alumni

Politicians

 Lal Krishna Advani – former Deputy Prime Minister of India; co-founder, Bharatiya Janata Party in India
 Shaukat Aziz – former Prime Minister of Pakistan
 Nabil Gabol – Federal Minister and politician
 Manuel Misquita – former Mayor of Karachi
 Asif Ali Zardari – former President of Pakistan; co-chairman, of Pakistan Peoples Party
 Muhammad Khan Junejo – former Prime Minister of Pakistan
 Muhammad Ayub Khuhro – Chief Minister of Sindh
 Yusuf Haroon – former Chief Minister of Sindh
 Jam Sadiq Ali – former Chief Minister of Sindh
 Pir Mazhar Ul Haq – senior minister of education
 Khurshid Mahmud Kasuri – Foreign Minister of Pakistan from 2002 to 2007
 Pervez Musharraf – former President of Pakistan, founder of All Pakistan Muslim League
 Syed Murad Ali Shah – Chief Minister of Sindh (since 2016)
 Shah Nawaz Bhutto - former chief minister of India's Junagadh State and father of Zulfiqar Ali Bhutto

Academics and researchers

 Prof. Adil Najam – international relations, environment and diplomacy scholar
 Eng. Izhar Haider – founder, Shiekh Khalifa Bin Zayed Arab Pakistani School, Abu Dhabi
 Dr Adil Haider – trauma surgeon and outcomes research scientist in the United States
 Prof. Haroon Ahmed – Professor of Micro-electronics, University of Cambridge and former Master Corpus Christi College, Cambridge.

Military

 Pervez Musharraf – former Chief of Army Staff; President of Pakistan
 Rashid Minhas – Nishan-i-Haider recipient
 Azim Daudpota – former Governor of Sindh; former managing director, Pakistan International Airlines
 Jehangir Karamat – former Chief of Army Staff
 Farooq Feroze Khan – former Chief of Air Staff
 Brigadier Mervyn Cardoza – Tamgha-e-Khidmat recipient

Sportsmen

 John Permal – fastest human in Pakistan (1964 to 1974)
 Michael Rodrigues – five-time national table tennis champion

Hockey

 Peter Paul Fernandes – 1936 Olympic hockey gold medallist
 Patrick Mendes – Olympic hockey player; teacher for over 50 years

Cricket

 Wallis Mathias – Test cricketer
 Danish Kaneria – Test cricketer
 Javed Miandad – Test cricketer
 Antao D'Souza – Test cricketer, made his debut against West Indies in 1959 at Karachi
 Wasim Bari – Test cricketer
 Faisal Iqbal – Test cricketer

Judiciary

 Wajihuddin Ahmed – Chief Justice of the Sindh High Court
 Justice Ajmal Mian – former Chief Justice of Pakistan

Civil service

 Irfan Husain - newspaper columnist and former civil servant.
 Usama Mashkoor - M.B.B.S Doctor and current civil servant.

Clergy

 Cardinal Valerian Gracias† – former archbishop of Bombay and first Asian cardinal
 Cardinal Joseph Cordeiro† – First Cardinal of Pakistan
 Simeon Anthony Pereira† – Archbishop of Karachi (1994–2002) 
 Anthony Theodore Lobo† – Bishop emeritus of the Roman Catholic Diocese of Islamabad-Rawalpindi

 Bonaventure Patrick Paul OFM† - Bishop of Hyderabad, Pakistan.
 Armando Trindade† - Archbishop of Lahore (1975-2001)
 James deSouza† - Catholic priest, teacher, school principal and humanitarian.
 Robert D'Silva† - Catholic priest 1952-2015
 Benny Mario Travas - Archbishop-elect of Karachi

Businessmen

 Cincinnatus Fabian D'Abreo, founder of Cincinnatus Town
 Sikandar Sultan – managing director, Shan Food Industries
 Nadeem Hussain – Founder & CEO, Tameer Bank, Tameer Bank
 Quentin D'Silva – former chairman and chief executive, Shell Pakistan Limited

 Omar Janjua - CEO Taco Bueno, USA

Educationists

 Father Stephen Raymond
 Dr Asif Farrukhi – writer, editor, translator, and a physician by training; Passed away on June 1, 2020

Other
 Khadim Hussain Baloch, cricket observer, author, and memorabilia collector
 O. B. Nazareth
 Ishaq Ibrahim

Photo gallery

See also

 Catholic Church in Pakistan
 Education in Karachi
 List of schools in Karachi
 List of Jesuit schools

References

External links
 The school's official website
 St. Patrick's High School, Karachi on Encyclopædia Britannica

1861 establishments in British India
2nd-millennium establishments in Pakistan
Educational institutions established in 1861
Catholic secondary schools in Pakistan
Saddar Town
Schools in Karachi
Catholic elementary and primary schools in Pakistan